Borjhar is a locality in Guwahati, situated on the western fringes of the metropolitan expanse of the city. Jalukbari is 12 km to the east with nearest Railway station and junction at Azara  and Kamakhya respectively.

Transport
Lokpriya Gopinath Bordoloi International Airport is located here and is well connected with rest of the city with A/C airport service buses and other mode of commercial vehicles or cabs.

Education
Kendriya Vidyalaya Borjhar, St. Claret High School, Miles Bronson Residential School are few of various schools located in this area. Guwahati College of Architecture is also located here.

See also
 Basistha
 Bhetapara
 Beltola

References

Neighbourhoods in Guwahati